Slaby is a surname of Czech, Polish, and Slovak-language origin. It may refer to:

 Adolf Slaby (1849–1913), German electronics pioneer
 Grit Slaby (born 1965), German swimmer
 John W. Slaby (1934–2017), American lawyer
 Lou Slaby (1941–2019), American football player
 Lynn Slaby (born 1938), American politician
 Marilyn Slaby (born 1939), American politician
 Michael Slaby, American entrepreneur
 Tamira Slaby (born 1992), German Paralympic athlete

See also
 

Czech-language surnames
Polish-language surnames
Slovak-language surnames